Romeo Shahinas (born 25 February 1996) is an Albanian professional footballer who plays as a midfielder for Italian club Arce and the Albania national under-21 football team.

Club career

Early career
Shahinas was born in Korçë, Albania and at age of 9 he moved to Italy alongside his family. During his time with Fabrica Carbognano he caught attention of A.S. Roma scouts and when they saw him during a tournament they invited him for a trial. During his trial Roma's scouts said that they were pleasured with his form and will offer him to sign a contract after a year. He had offers from different Italian clubs such as S.S. Lazio, ACF Fiorentina and Empoli F.C. but decided to sign with Roma in 2009.

Latina
On 28 July 2014 he signed for U.S. Latina and was put into the primavera team. During the second-half of the 2014–15 season of Serie B he gained entry with the first team and participated in 4 matches.

He made it his first professional debut on 2 April 2016 against Avellino coming on as a substitute in place of Pasquale Schiattarella.

Partizani Tirana
Following arrival of Mark Iuliano as a head coach of FK Partizani Tirana, he brought along Shahinas and Andrea Selvaggio with parameters 0. Shortly after the departure of coach Mark Iuliano, Partizani announced to have interrupted contracts by mutual consensus with Shahinas along Andrea Selvaggio, Eric Herrera and Milan Basrak.

In summer 2019, Shahinas signed for US Arce after a spell at Rotonda Calcio.

International career
Shahinas received his first Albania under-17 call-up by manager Džemal Mustedanagić for a friendly tournament developed in August 2012 in Romania.

Shahinas participated with the Albania national under-17 football team in the 2013 UEFA European Under-17 Championship qualifying round during October 2012. Under the national coach Dzemal Mustedanagić he played in 2 matches, 1 as a starter and 1 as a substitute, also being an unused substitute on the bench for 1 match.

He was invited once at the Albania national under-19 football team by coach Foto Strakosha for the friendly match against Italy U19 on 14 May 2014.

Personal life
Shahinas has declared that he is a fan of A.S. Roma and that was the reason that he signed immediately with them in first offer, despite other offers. His inspirations are Daniele De Rossi at Roma and Lorik Cana, the Albania national team's captain for their style of warriors on the pitch.

Career statistics

Club

References

External links

1996 births
Living people
Footballers from Korçë
Albanian footballers
Albania youth international footballers
Association football midfielders
Latina Calcio 1932 players
S.S. Racing Club Roma players
FK Partizani Tirana players
Serie B players
Serie C players
Serie D players
Albanian expatriate footballers
Albanian expatriate sportspeople in Italy
Expatriate footballers in Italy